Selenogyrus aureus is a species of tarantula, in the subfamily Selenogyrinae. It is endemic Sierra Leone.

Diagnosis
Selenogyrus aureus lacks a stridulatory organ between the chelicerae. The male is known only. There is no clypeus and there is a covering of soft tissue on the chelicerae. It has a uniform brownish-yellow colour, with golden tinge. It is 31mm long.

References

Theraphosidae
Spiders described in 1897
Spiders of Africa